The tragedy of Rostam and Sohrab forms part of the 10th-century Persian epic Shahnameh by the Persian poet Ferdowsi. It tells the tragic story of the heroes Rostam and his son, Sohrab.

Plot
Rostam lived in Zabulistan, hero and one of the favorites of King Kaykavous. Once, following the traces of his lost horse, he enters the kingdom of Samangan where he becomes the guest of the king during the search for his horse. There, Rostam meets princess Tahmina. She admires Rostam and knows of his reputation. She goes into his room at night and asks if he will give her a child and in return, she will bring his horse. Rostam leaves after he impregnates Tahmina and his horse is returned. Before he leaves, he gives her two tokens. If she has a girl, she is to take the jewel and plait it in the girl's hair. If she has a boy, she is to take the seal and bind it on the boy's arm. Nine months later, she bears his child—a son, whom she later names Sohrab. Years go by before Rostam and Sohrab meet. Finally, a new war between Zabulistan and Turan is on the horizon. The two armies face each other and prepare for the imminent battle. By then, Sohrab has become known as the best fighter of Turan army. But Rostam's legend precedes him and the Turan army cowers before the hero. No one else dares to fight Rostam, so Sohrab is sent to wrestle with the legendary hero. Though Sohrab knows his father' name, he is unaware that the man before him is Rostam. On the battlefield, Rostam and Sohrab fight for what seems like an eternity, neither knowing the true name of his opponent.

After a very long and heavy bout of wrestling, Rostam breaks Sohrab's back and stabs him. Sohrab, dying, tells Rostam that his father will avenge his death and only then do they realize their identities. Sohrab shows the armband amulet that Rostam once gave Tahmina, who gave it to her son to keep him safe during the war. Rostam grieves heavily, sends Goudarz to get the medicine (Panacea) but it came too late. When Tahmina finds out her son is dead, she burns Sohrab's house and gives away all his riches. Then "the breath departed from out her body, and her spirit went forth after Sohrab her son."

Adaptations

 Sohrab and Rustum (1853), by Matthew Arnold, English language.
 Rustam and Zohrab (1910), by Uzeyir Hajibeyov, Azerbaijani language.
 Rustom O Sohrab (1929), by Agha Hashar Kashmiri, Urdu language.
 Rostam va Sohrab (1957), by Shahrok Rafi, Iranian film, Persian language.
 Rustom Sohrab (1963), by Vishram Bedekar, Indian Hindi language film starring Prithviraj, Premnath, Suraiyya and Mumtaz.
 Rustam and Zohrab (1971), by Boris Kimyagarov, Soviet Tajik film, Russian language.
 Rostam and Sohrab (1988), by Loris Tjeknavorian, Persian language.
 Dastan-e Rustam-ou Suhrab, a Tajik film produced by Benyamin Kimyagarov. The film plot differs from the story in some places. For example, Tahmineh comes to the battlefield trying to stop the fight; Rustam gives an arm band (not a necklace) large enough to only have fit his stout arms, and now only fit Sohrab's arm; and, Rustam uses a poisoned knife to stab his son.
 Battle of the Kings: Rostam & Sohrab (2013) Iranian animation,  by Kianoush Dalvand, Persian language. The film plot differs from the story, for example Sohrab not dead at the end.
 Sooge Sohrab (The Tragedy of Sohrab) (2014) (musical piece), by Sahba Aminikia, English language.

See also
Babruvahana, a character from the Indian epic Mahabharatam that the story of Rustom-Sohrab resembles, including the father-son duel, a bejewelled memento, and the lost horse.
Aided Óenfhir Aífe
Hildebrandslied

References

The Tragedy of Sohrab and Rostam *Translated by Jerome W. Clinton
Rostam and Sohrab By: Hakim Abol Qasem Ferdowsi Tousi Translated by: Helen Zimmern*
[The Kite Runner By: Khaled Hosseini, page 29]*

External links
 
 
 List of film adaptations for Rustam and Sohrab at IMDb
 EastPage: The Rustan and Sohrab Poem. Russian translation

Shahnameh stories
Tragedies (dramas)
Iranian folklore
Filicide in fiction